Alabi Olabiyi Olufemi, also known as Femi Alabi, is a Nigerian para table tennis player and Paralympian.

Career 

He represented Nigeria at the 2000 Summer Paralympics held in Sydney, Australia and he competed in table tennis. He won the bronze medal at the Men's singles 9 event.

He also won the gold medal at the team event together with Tajudeen Agunbiade and Tunde Adisa.

In July 2019, he qualified to represent Nigeria at the 2020 Summer Paralympics in Tokyo, Japan after winning the individual class 10 event at the 2019 ITTF African Para Table Tennis Championships. He won one of the bronze medals in the men's team C9-10 event at the 2020 Summer Paralympics.

Achievements

References

External links 
 

Living people
Year of birth missing (living people)
Place of birth missing (living people)
Nigerian male table tennis players
Table tennis players at the 2000 Summer Paralympics
Table tennis players at the 2020 Summer Paralympics
Paralympic table tennis players of Nigeria
Medalists at the 2000 Summer Paralympics
Medalists at the 2020 Summer Paralympics
Paralympic gold medalists for Nigeria
Paralympic bronze medalists for Nigeria
Paralympic medalists in table tennis
20th-century Nigerian people
21st-century Nigerian people